Pingjiang Road, historically known as Shiquan Li (Chinese:十泉里), is a street and historic district in Gusu District (formerly the Pingjiang District), northeastern Suzhou, Jiangsu, China. It is a well-preserved area and is part of the so-called Old Town of Suzhou.

In 2015, the Pingjiang Road Historical Block was added to the list of China's "National Historic and Cultural Streets".

Overview
It stretches from Ganjiang Donglu (Chinese:干将东路) in the south to Baita Road East (Chinese:白塔东路) in the northwest, near the Humble Administrator's Garden and Suzhou Museum. The city of Suzhou was known as Pingjiang during Southern Song Dynasty. As a major thoroughfare of eastern Suzhou back then, the street carries on the former name of the city. It was featured in the map Pingjiang Tu (Chinese:平江图), produced in the year 1229. There are 51 smaller alleys intersecting the street.

In 2009, Pingjiang Road was listed as a Zhongguo Lishi Wenhua Mingjie (Chinese:中国历史文化名街, literally: Famous historical and cultural street of China), one of the first nine streets with such title across China. Along with Shantang Street, the area was also declared a Zhongguo Lishi Wenhua Jiequ (Chinese:中国历史文化街区, literally: Historical and cultural block of China) in 2015.

A BBC Travel article describes Pingjiang Road as less touristy than Shantang Street and states that it is "lined with houses that embody Suzhou’s style – graceful, simple and timeless. Pingjiang Road gives an insight into the leisurely existence of the city’s residents. [It is a] centre of Suzhou's artistic life, lined with bookshops and local opera theatres. There are also several teahouses, where people gather for performances of traditional storytelling and ballad singing".

Couple's Retreat Garden (Ou Yuan), a noted Classical Garden located within the historic district, is part of the UNESCO World Heritage Site Classical Gardens of Suzhou. Guanqian Street is also in walking distance. There are two national-class and 12 provincial-class protection units within the historic district. Pingjiang Road undergone a major renovation prior to the 28th Session of the World Heritage Committee which took place in Suzhou in 2004.

Bridges within the district
There are 18 stone bridges in the Pingjiang Road historic district. Among them, 12 bridges (or in their previous forms) are shown on the Song Dynasty Pingjiang Tu. They are namely Sipo, Shou'an, Xuegao, Jiqing, Sujun, Zhong'an, Tongli, Huxingsi, Beikaiming, Tangjia, Zhumajiao and Xiaoxin. 10 of the bridges are lying in the north–south direction, the other eight in the east–west direction. The historic district thus has the highest density of bridges across Suzhou.

The story of Hong Jun and Sai Jinhua

Hong Jun, a scholar and diplomat temporarily residing on 27 Xuanqiao Lane, Pingjiang Road, met 20-year-old Sai Jinhua in 1886, then as a prostitute while on a flower boat. At the time Hong Jun was in mourning due to his mother's death. Hong Jun made Sai Jinhua his concubine one year after meeting her. Sai Jinhua followed Hong Jun in his diplomatic visits to Russia, Germany, Australia and the Netherlands, Sai Jinhua also gave birth to a daughter named Deguan. The couple returned to Suzhou in 1893 and made 29 Xuanqiao Lane home, neighboring Hong Jun's former residence. However, two months after their return, Hong Jun became sick and died at age 55. Sai Jinhua was forced to leave the house after Hong's death and carried on her profession as a courtesan in Shanghai.

Transportation
Pingjiang Road is within walking distance to the Xiangmen Station of Line 1, Suzhou Rail Transit.

Gallery

See also

 Pingjiang Subdistrict

References

External links
 

Geography of Suzhou
Gusu District
History of Suzhou
Tourist attractions in Suzhou